The 1975 Kentucky gubernatorial election was held on November 4, 1975. Incumbent Democrat Julian Carroll defeated Republican nominee Robert E. Gable with 62.84% of the vote.

Primary elections
Primary elections were held on May 27, 1975.

Democratic primary

Candidates
Julian Carroll, incumbent Governor
Todd Hollenbach, Jefferson County Judge/Executive
Mary Louise Foust, former Kentucky State Auditor
Robert McCreary Johnson

Results

Republican primary

Candidates
Robert E. Gable, businessman
Elmer Begley Jr.
Tommy Klein
Granville Thomas

Results

General election

Candidates
Julian Carroll, Democratic
Robert E. Gable, Republican

Results

References

1975
Kentucky
Governor